Dheeme Dheeme is a 2009 Bollywood film starring Shiney Ahuja, Priyanka Sharma. It is directed by Kumar Sahni and produced by Pritish Nandy.

Cast

 Shiney Ahuja
 Priyanka Sharma

Soundtrack

Critical reception

References

2009 films
2000s Hindi-language films